Oberhosenbach is an Ortsgemeinde – a municipality belonging to a Verbandsgemeinde, a kind of collective municipality – in the Birkenfeld district in Rhineland-Palatinate, Germany. It belongs to the Verbandsgemeinde Herrstein-Rhaunen, whose seat is in Herrstein.

Geography

The municipality lies roughly 18 km north of Idar-Oberstein near the Deutsche Edelsteinstraße (“German Gem Road”) and the Hunsrück Schiefer- und Burgenstraße (“Hunsrück Slate and Castle Road”). Half the municipal area is wooded.

History
In 1318, Oberhosenbach had its first documentary mention as Volmarshusenbach.

Politics

Municipal council
The council is made up of 6 council members, who were elected by majority vote at the municipal election held on 7 June 2009, and the honorary mayor as chairwoman.

Mayor
Oberhosenbach's mayor is Kirsten Beetz, and her deputies are Reinhold Noll and Gabriele Wolter.

Coat of arms
The municipality's arms might be described thus: Per bend vert a cross Latin Or and Or a lion rampant gules armed and langued azure.

Culture and sightseeing

The following are listed buildings or sites in Rhineland-Palatinate’s Directory of Cultural Monuments:
 Hauptstraße 9 – Quereinhaus (a combination residential and commercial house divided for these two purposes down the middle, perpendicularly to the street), Firstständer building, 1696
 Hauptstraße 34 – Quereinhaus, 1903; bakehouse typical of the time of building

Economy and infrastructure

Running south of the municipality is Bundesstraße 41. Serving nearby Fischbach is a railway station on the Nahe Valley Railway (Bingen–Saarbrücken).

References

External links
Municipality’s official webpage 

Birkenfeld (district)